Azra Erhat (4 June 1915 – 6 September 1982) was a Turkish author, archaeologist, academician, classical philologist, and translator. A pioneer of Turkish Humanism, Azra Erhat is especially well known for her published works, including many translations into Turkish from the classical literature of Ancient Greece.

Biography
Azra Erhat was born on 4 June 1915 in Şişli, Istanbul. Her parents were Tevfik Bey and Nasibe Hanım. Nakibe and her sister, Mukbile, were the children of Fatma Hanım and Fadıl Bey. Fadıl Bey (1857-1938) was born in Selanik (Thessaloniki),today in Greece, where he completed his primary and secondary education before traveling to Istanbul, where he graduated from law school. Working as a lawyer while splitting his time between Istanbul and Thessaloniki, Fadil and his wife, Fatma, eventually settled down in Büyükada Island, Istanbul Province, in 1923.  

The period of Azra Erhat’s birth was a time of upheaval, coinciding with the occupation of Constantinople by British, French, and Italian forces. She moved with her parents to Izmir in 1922 and to Vienna, Austria in 1924, when her father's work was transferred there. Erhat received two years of primary education in Volksschule, Vienna, before her father's work necessitated another move, this time to Brussels, Belgium. There she completed primary school and then attended Emile Jacqmain High School (fr) where she gained a strong interest in literature while studying French, Flemish, Latin, and Ancient Greek. When Erhat's father died in 1932, Azra stayed in Brussels at a friend's home to complete high school while her family moved back to Istanbul. Finishing with the highest achievement level -(), she then rejoined her family in Istanbul. In 1934 Azra entered the Istanbul University Faculty of Arts degree, where her most influential instructor was the Austrian romance philologist and prolific literary critic, Leo Spitzer. Introducing Erhat to Professor George Rodhe of Ankara University in 1936, Spitzer recommended Azra for a student-assistant position translating Rodhe's lessons from French, German, Latin, and Greek content into Turkish. On September 1, 1936, Erhat accepted the offer and transferred to the newly inaugurated Department of Classical Philology of the Faculty of Languages, History, and Geography at Ankara University. Working as a student-translator-assistant up to and beyond graduation in 1939, she continued as an assistant in the University's Department of Classical Philology and became an associate professor in 1946. During this same period, Azra also worked in the Translation Office established by Minister of Education Hasan Ali Yücel with fellow Turkish Humanism pioneers Sabahattin Eyüboğlu, Vedat Günyol (tr), Orhan Burian (tr), and Saffet Korkut, establishing close friendships with them. In 1945, separately and together with Orhan Veli, she translated and published many works from Homer, Aristophanes, Sophocles, and Plato. 

With the departure of Hasan Ali Yücel as Turkey’s minister of education following the 1946 elections, the political atmosphere began changing in the Department of Education. In 1948, during a cleansing of left-leaning thinkers, Erhat and fellow faculty members, including Pertev Naili Boratav, Behice Boran, Adnan Cemgil (tr), and Niyazi Berkes, were dismissed from Ankara University. Returning to Istanbul, Erhat continued working from 1949 to 1955 as a translator, an art critic, and news reporter, when she received a position with the Turkish daily newspaper, Vatan, where she worked until 1956. From 1956 until her retirement in 1975, Erhat worked in the library of the United Nations' International Labour Organization (ILO) Near and Middle East Center. In 1971, Erhat, Sabahattin Eyüboğlu, and Vedat Günyol were arrested and charged with violating Article 141 of the Turkish Criminal Code (establishing a secret communist organization) during the coup d’etat of March 12 1971 Turkish military memorandum. Detained for 4 months in the Maltepe Military Prison, Erhat and her companions were released in the first legal session. While she was unable to work throughout the one and a half years until her lawsuit was finally closed, the ILO supported Erhat and protected her staff.

The years between 1956 and 1982 are considered Erhat's most creative and prolific period, with the publication of many literary works during this time.  Individual works and others she collaborated on with Sabahattin Eyüboğlu were published in New Horizons Magazine. In collaboration with Ibrahim Abdulkadir Mericboyu, alias/pen-name A. Kadir (tr), Erhat translated Homer's Iliad, winning the Habib Törehan Science Award in 1959 for Volume 1, and the Turkish Language Institution Translation Award in 1961 for Volume 3. Erhat's translation of Homer's Odyssey was published in 1970, her Dictionary of Mythology was published in 1972, and her Ph.D. thesis provided the material published in collaboration with Cengiz Bektaş in 1978 entitled, Conversations and Poetry on Sappho. Azra Erhat also occasionally wrote under the pseudonym Ayşe Nur.

On September 6, 1982, after unsuccessful treatment in London for cancer, Azra Erhat died in Istanbul at age 67. Her body was buried at the Bülbüldere Cemetery in Üsküdar, Istanbul. 

Following Erhat’s death, her books were endowed to Anadolu University, with a collection created in her memory. In 1983, in honor of Erhat’s significant contribution to Classical Literature translations, Yazko a Turkish journal of translation, began offering a literary award in her name.

Azra Erhat’s translations of Homer’s Iliad and Odyssey are still primary sources of classical literature in Turkey today. Drawn from Erhat’s distinctive humanism gained “from local values and bridges between Western cultures and Anatolian cultures,” her language and writing style “provides a simple and understandable epic text.” Enabling readers who are unable to read the original texts, Erhat’s translations, “which are not only linguistically but structurally and formally successful, also carry the Anatolian identity that the translator cares about and reflect the epicenter of the land they belong to.”

In the Introduction to Azra Erhat’s book, İşte İnsan (Ecce Homo), Azra writes: (Turkish):

Büyük tuttum bu işi: dört yıllık düşüncemi, yaşantımı bir kitaba sığdırmak isterdim. Homeros'ta insan dedim yola çıktım, beden ruh ikiliği dikildi karşıma, aldım inceledim; derken Platon'un insan anlayışı, toplum görüşü çeldi aklımı, onu da kavrayayım derken açıldım uçsuz bucaksız bir düşünce alanına. Özgürlük, mutluluk, insancılık... Sorunlar, saçları altın tellerle örülmüş öcüler gibi çekti sürükledi beni oradan oraya. (...) Bir desteğim vardı: Yaşantıya olan güvenim. İnsanı mı konu edindim: insan gibi yaşayayım kendimi vere vere, dolu dizgin, coşkunca yaşayayım ki insanı anlayayım, insanı söyleyebileyim. (...) Sevgiyi ahlak edindim kendime. İnsancılığı yalnız sevgide gördüm ve sevgiden bekledim, kitabımı satır satır yazdırsın bana. Yanılmadım da: Ecce Homo'yu bana sevgi yazdırdı.
-Azra Erhat-

(From the same webpage translated to English by Google Translate:) I've kept this great job: four years of thought, I want to fit my life in a book. In Homer, I went on the road, body soul duality was erected, and I looked at it; Plato's human understanding, society, the wisdom of my mind, I understand it, I opened up to an immense field of thought. Freedom, happiness, humanity ... Problems, hairs woven with gold wires attracted the dangers pulled me from there. (...) I had a support: I have confidence in life. I've made a human being: I live like a human, I want to live a full, full of enthusiasm, let me understand the human, I can say human. I saw humanity in love alone and waited for love, let me print my book in line by line. I wasn't mistaken: Ecce Homo wrote me with love.
-Azra Erhat-

Origination of Turkey’s “Blue Cruise” Movement

Strongly connected with her activities as a writer and translator, Erhat’s recreational activities likewise significantly impacted the rising trend of Westernization in Kemal Atatürk’s newly-formed Republic of Turkey. Together with fellow authors Cevat Şakir Kabaağaçlı, alias/pen-name The Fisherman of Halicarnassus, and Sabahattin Eyüboğlu, Azra Erhat is considered an originator of the literary and touristic term, Blue Cruise. Used in Turkey's tourism industry, the name Blue Cruise (or Blue Voyage) is the title of Erhat’s travelogue, Mavi Yolculuk, originally published in 1962 and republished in 2005.

Cevat Şakir Kabaağaçlı, sentenced in 1925 to a 3-year exile to Bodrum found this sleepy fishing village known in antiquity as Halicarnassus so charming that, long after his exile ended, he returned to settle down there. Convincing his closest friends and fellow members of the Turkish intelligentsia of the unspoiled beauties of the shoreline and rural environment of Bodrum, authors Sabahattin Eyüboğlu, Azra Erhat, and others soon joined Cevat, who had renamed himself Halikarnas Balıkçısı (the Fisherman of Halicarnassus). In the coming decades, the close friends would enjoy many long sailing trips together in the local sponge divers' sailing boats, called gulets. Finding herself immersed in a lush natural landscape seemingly unchanged since antiquity, Erhat viewed her surroundings as “the scenes of historical and mythological events.” Expressing her strong belief that Anatolia gave birth to Western civilization, Erhat charmed her companions (and soon her readers) with detailed discussions from Classical Literature on Halicarnassus, Troy, Pergamum, Ephesus, and other famous Anatolian sites of Ancient Greece.

Especially with the 1962 release of Erhat’s immensely popular travel book, Mavi Yolculuk (Blue Cruise), and articles written by Erhat and her colleagues at New Horizons Magazine, the Turkish reading public began flocking to this region. Guidebooks were published in both Turkish and German and soon the Turquoise Coast became an international tourist destination that is still famous today for Blue Cruises.

Enduring until the end of their lives, the relationship between Azra Erhat and the Fisherman of Halicarnassus blossomed into a love story regularly nourished by Blue Cruises when they were together and thousands of letters written to each other when they were apart. After Halikarnas Balıkçısı died in 1972, with his prior permission, Erhat published a collection of his letters in her 1976 book, Letters of the Fisherman of Halicarnassus.

Bibliography
Azra Erhat has written 104 works in 307 publications in 2 languages and 633 library holdings, according to WorldCat Identities. Among her more popular books, WorldCat notes,  Mektuplarıyle Halikarnas Balıkçısı (Letters of the Halicarnassus Fisherman), has had “15 editions published between 1976 and 2002 in Turkish and held by 43 WorldCat member libraries worldwide,” and Mitoloji sözlüğü (Dictionary of Mythology), with “20 editions published between 1972 and 2011 in Turkish and ‘undetermined’ and held by 40 WorldCat member libraries worldwide.” 

{| class="sortable wikitable"
! Year !! Title !! Coauthors !! Publisher !! Notes
|-
| 1944 || Sophocles’ Elektra (Ἠλέκτρα/Elektra) || || Milli Eğitim Bakanlığı Yayınları || Translation 
|-
| 1954 || A. Gabriel’s Türkiye Tarih ve Sanat Memleketi (Turkey’s Native History and Art) || || Doğan Kardeş || Translation 
|-
| 1954 || Colette’s Dişi Kedi (La Chatte/The cat) || || Varlık Yayınları || Translation 
|-
| 1958 || Aristophanes’ Hayatı, Sanatı, Eseri (Life, Art, Work) || || Varlık Yayınları || Translation 
|-
| 1960 || Mavi Anadolu (Blue Anatolia) || || Bilgi Yayınevi || 
|-
| 1962 || Mavi Yolculuk (Blue Voyage/Blue Cruise) || || Çan yayınları ||
|-
| 1962 || Mavi Yolculuk II (Blue Voyage/Blue Cruise II) || Faruk Kırkan (editor) || Çan yayınları ||
|-
| 1962 || Homer’s İlyada (Ἰλιάς/The Iliad) || A. Kadir || Türkiye İş Bankası Kültür Yayınları || Translation
|-
| 1965 || Vercors’ İnsan ve İnsanlar (Human and Humans) || Sabahattin Eyuboğlu, Vedat Günyol || Çan yayınları || Translation
|-
| 1966 || Aristophanes’ Lysistrata (Λυσιστράτη/Lysistrata) || Sabahattin Eyuboğlu || Remzi Kitabevi || Translation
|-
| 1968 || Antoine de Saint-Exupéry’s Küçük Prens (Le Petit Prince: La planète des Globus) || || Yankı Yayınları || Translation
|-
| 1968 || Yasunari Kawabata’s Bin Beyaz Turna / İzu Dansözü (千羽鶴 /Sembazuru) || Zeyyat Selimoğlu || Cem Yayınevi || Translation
|-
| 1969 || İşte İnsan - Ecce Homo (Here is Human) || || Remzi Kitabevi ||
|-
| 1969 || Vincent Van Gogh’s Theo’ya Mektuplar (Dear Theo: The Letters of Vincent Van Gogh) || || Yankı Yayınları || Translation
|-
| 1970 || Homer’s Odysseia  (Ὀδύσσεια/The Odyssey) || A. Kadir || Sander yayınları || Translation
|-
| 1972 || Mitoloji Sözlüğü (Dictionary of Mythology) || ||  Remzi Kitabevi ||
|-
| 1972 || Plato’s Şölen - Dostluk  (Συμπόσιον/Symposium) || Sabahattin Eyuboğlu || Remzi Kitabevi || Translation
|-
| 1973 || François Rabelais’ Gargantua || Sabahattin Eyuboğlu, Vedat Günyol || Cem Yayınevi  || Translation
|-
| 1975 || Aristophanes’ Eşekarıları, Kuşlar, Kömürcüler, Barış, Kadınlar Savaşı (The Wasps, The Birds, The Acharnians, Peace, Lysistrata) || Sabahattin Eyuboğlu || Hürriyet Yayınları || Translation
|-
| 1976 || Homeros - Gül ile Söyleşi (Homer - Interview with Rose) || || Cem Yayınevi ||
|-
| 1976 || Mektuplarıyla Halikarnas Balıkçısı (Letters of the Fisherman of Halicarnassus) || || Çağdaş Yayınları ||
|-
| 1977 || Hesiodos, Eserleri ve Kaynakları (Works and Resources) || Sabahattin Eyüboğlu || Türk Tarih Kurumu Basimevi|| Translation
|-
| 1977 || Hesiod’s Theogonia - İşler ve Günler (Θεογονία - Ἔργα καὶ Ἡμέραι/Theogony - Works and Days) || Sabahattin Eyüboğlu || Türk Tarih Kurumu Basimevi || Translation
|-
| 1977 || Pir Sultan Abdal’s Pir Sultan Abdal (Sufi Poetry of Patriarch Sultan Abdal) || Sabahattin Eyüboğlu, Attila Özkırımlı, Asim Bezirci || Cem Yayınevi || Translation
|-
| 1978 || Sappho - Üzerine Konuşmalar ve Şiir Çevirileri (Conversations and Poetry on Sappho) || Cengiz Bektaş || Cem Yayınevi || Translation
|-
| 1978 || Sevgi Yönetimi (Love Management) || || Çaǧdaş Yayınları ||
|-
| 1979 || Karya'dan Pamfilya'ya Mavi Yolculuk (Blue Cruise from Karya to Pamphylia) || || Cem Yayınevi  ||
|-
| 1981 || Halikarnas Balıkçısı: Düşün Yazıları (Halicarnassus Fisherman: Thought Articles) || Halikarnas Balıkçısı || Bilgi Yayınevi ||
|-
| 1981 || Troya Masalları (Troy Tales) || || Cem Yayınevi ||
|-
| 1991 || Colette’s Cicim (Chéri) || || Can Yayinlari || Translation
|-
| 1991 || Hesiodos, Eserleri ve Kaynakları (Works and Resources) || Sabahattin Eyüboğlu || Türk Tarih Kurumu Basimevi || 
|-
| 1993 ||Pir Sultan Abdal’s Pir Sultan Abdal (Sufi Poetry of Patriarch Sultan Abdal) || Sabahattin Eyüboğlu, Attila Özkırımlı, Asim Bezirci || Cem Yayınevi || 
|-
| 1994 || Vercors’ İnsan ve İnsanlar (Human and Humans) || Sabahattin Eyuboğlu, Vedat Günyol || Toplumsal Dönüşüm Yayınları || 
|-
| 1996 || Gulleyla'ya Anilar: En hakiki mürşit (Gulleyla Memories: The Most Genuine Artist) || || Cem Yayınevi ||
|-
| 1996 || İşte İnsan - Ecce Homo (Here is Human) || || Adam Yayınları || 
|-
| 1999 || Antoine de Saint-Exupéry’s Savaş Uçuşu (Courrier sud/South Courier) || || İnkılâp Kitabevi || 
|-
| 1999 || Homeros - Gül ile Söyleşi || || İş Bankası Kültür Yayınları ||
|-
| 1999 || Sappho - Üzerine Konuşmalar ve Şiir Çevirileri (Conversations and Poetry on Sappho) || Cengiz Bektaş || Cumhuriyet Gazetesi || Translation
|-
| 2000 || Aristophanes’ Lysistrata (Λυσιστράτη/Lysistrata) || Sabahattin Eyuboğlu || Türkiye İş Bankası Kültür Yayınları || 
|-
| 2001 || Homeros - Gül ile Söyleşi (Homer - Interview with Rose) || ||Türkiye İş Bankası Kültür Yayınları || 
|-
| 2002 || Mektuplarıyla Halikarnas Balıkçısı (Letters of the Fisherman of Halicarnassus) || || Can Yayınları || 
|-
| 2002 || Osmanlı Münevverinden Türk Aydınına (From Ottoman to Turkish) || || Can Yayınları || 
|-
| 2005 || Homer’s Odysseia  (Ὀδύσσεια/The Odyssey) || A. Kadir || Can Yayınları || 
|-
| 2005 || Homer: Tepegözlerin Mağarasında (In the Cave of the Cyclops) || A. Kadir || Can Yayınları || 
|-
| 2006 || François Rabelais’ Gargantua || Sabahattin Eyuboğlu, Vedat Günyol || Türkiye İş Bankası Kültür Yayınları || 
|-
| 2009 || Mavi Anadolu (Blue Anatolia) || || Can Yayınları ||  
|-
| 2009 || Troya Masalları (Troy Tales) || ||Günışığı Kitaplığı || 
|-
| 2012 || Sophocles’ Elektra” (Ἠλέκτρα/Elektra) || || Türkiye İş Bankası Kültür Yayınları ||  
|-
| 2013 || Colette’s Cicim (Chéri) || || Can Yayinlari || 
|-
| 2013 || Colette’s Dişi Kedi (La Chatte/The cat) || || Can Yayınları || 
|-
| 2013 || Aeschylus’ Zincire Vurulmuş Prometheus (Προμηθεύς Δεσμώτης/Prometheus Bound) || Sabahattin Eyuboğlu || Türkiye İş Bankası Kültür Yayınları || 
|-
| 2013 || Aristophanes’ Eşekarıları, Kuşlar, Kömürcüler, Barış, Kadınlar Savaşı (The Wasps, The Birds, The Acharnians, Peace, Lysistrata) || Sabahattin Eyuboğlu || Türkiye İş Bankası Kültür Yayınları || 
|-
| 2014 || Homer’s İlyada (Ἰλιάς/The Iliad) || A. Kadir || Türkiye İş Bankası Kültür Yayınları || 
|-
| 2014 || Plato’s Şölen - Dostluk  (Συμπόσιον/Symposium) || Sabahattin Eyuboğlu || Türkiye İş Bankası Kültür Yayınları || 
|-
| 2015 || Aglayan Kaya Niobe Siirler (The Weeping Rock of Niobe - Poetry) || Hakký Avan, Seval Arslan, A. Kadir Guzel || Arkeoloji ve Sanat Yayinlari ||  
|-
| 2015 || Gulleyla'ya Anilar: En hakiki mürşit (Gulleyla Memories: The Most Genuine Artist) || || Can Yayinlari || 
|-
| 2015 || Mavi Yolculuk II (Blue Voyage/Blue Cruise II) || Faruk Kırkan (editor) || Inkilap Kitabevi || 
|-
| 2015 || Mitoloji Sözlüğü (Dictionary of Mythology) || || Remzi Kitabevi || 
|-
| 2015 || Sevgi Yönetimi (Love Management) || || Can Yayinlari || 
|-
| 2016 || Antoine de Saint-Exupéry’s Küçük Prens (Le Petit Prince: La planète des Globus) || || Eksik Parça || 
|-
| 2016 || Hesiod’s Theogonia - İşler ve Günler (Θεογονία - Ἔργα καὶ Ἡμέραι/Theogony - Works and Days) || Sabahattin Eyüboğlu || Türkiye İş Bankası Kültür Yayınları|| 
|-
| 2017 || Halikarnas Balıkçısı: Düşün Yazıları (Halicarnassus Fisherman: Thought Articles) || Halikarnas Balıkçısı || Bilgi Yayınevi || 
|-
| 2017 || Osmanlı Münevverinden Türk Aydınına (From Ottoman to Turkish) || || Can Yayınları || 
|-
| 2017 || Vincent Van Gogh’s Theo’ya Mektuplar (Dear Theo: The Letters of Vincent Van Gogh) || || Remzi Kitabevi || 
|}

References

External links
 Who is Who database - Biography of Azra Erhat 
 CORE - Azra Erhat - Azra Erhat CORE  by S Saydam, 2002 
 CORE Search - Search CORE for Azra Erhat 
 Atatürk Institute -  Biography and Works of Azra Erhat. Atatürk Institute. Boğaziçi University, 2001. 
 Issuu - Azra Erhat is 100 Years Old  Istanbul University Faculty of Letters Classical Philological Society published in December 2015 and distributed free of charge.  
 Turkish Language and Literature - Who is Azra Erhat? Life, Literary Personality, Works Turkish Language And Literature, Turkedebiyati.Org 
 Writers of Turkey - Azra Erhat Writers of Turkey, tr.writersofturkey.net 
 GoodReads - Azra Erhat GoodReads, Inc 
 Gittigidiyor - Books by Azra Erhat Gittigidiyor, a subsidiary of eBay, is a Turkish e-shopping marketplace 
 Online Computer Library Center - Azra Erhat 1915-  WorldCat/Identities: OCLC Online Computer Library Center, Inc., Dublin, OH, USA

1915 births
1982 deaths
Writers from Istanbul
Turkish translators
Translators from Greek
Translators to Turkish
20th-century translators
Classical scholars
Academic staff of Ankara University
Archaeologists from Istanbul